The 10th Malay Regiment, established on 21 May 1949, was the only predominantly Malay regiment of the Malayan National Liberation Army (MNLA). Other regiments of this armed wing of the Malayan Communist Party were predominantly Chinese. The regiment fought against the British occupation of Malaysia after World War II.

The name 10th Malay Regiment was after the 10 Zulhijjah, or the Hari Raya Qurban, celebrated by the Muslims in remembrance on the incident where Abraham had to sacrifice Ishmael after he received signs from God. It was on the 10th of Zulhijjah when they formed the 10th Malay Regiment.

References 
 

Military history of Malaysia